Ed McTaggart (born July 10, 1951) is an American drummer and artist. He is best known as the drummer of the rock band Daniel Amos.

McTaggart joined DA in 1976, after years of playing with Bill Sprouse Jr.'s band The Road Home.

In the 1980s, McTaggart became the V.P. of Creative Services for Frontline Records.

References

1951 births
Living people
American rock drummers
American male drummers
American photographers
20th-century American drummers
The Swirling Eddies members
Daniel Amos members
20th-century American male musicians